Renato Federico Alfredo Mastropietro (born 29 September 1945 in Milan) is a former professional racecar driver. He drove in the FIA GT Championship from 1997 to 2000 making 10 starts over those years. He also drove a Porsche 911 to a 9th place overall finish (2nd in GT2) in the 1994 24 Hours of Le Mans.

External links
Driver DB Profile
Profile on 24h-en-piste.com

1945 births
Racing drivers from Milan
Living people
24 Hours of Le Mans drivers
24 Hours of Daytona drivers
20th-century Italian people